Alexander Evgenevich Gerunov (born December 10, 1979 in Tolyatti, Russia), is a Russian Karateka who won the World Championships (2004), European Championships (2004) and World Games (2005). He is also an instructor of the School of Combat Skills "Soyuz" (Togliatti, Russia). Gerunov was born and trained in Togliatti by trainer, Valerie P. Kokshin. He's trained in Shotokan, Wado-ryu Goju-ryu, Shito-ryu and Taekwondo.

Major achievements
 European Karate Federation Championships +80 kg Kumite, Champion 2004
 World Karate Federation Championships +80 kg Kumite, Champion  2004
 World Games +80 kg Kumite, Champion 2005
 World Shito ryu Karate Federation Championships +75 kg Kumite, Champion 2006
 On November 28, 2005, he was given the title of the Laureate of State Prize, "The Golden Belt of Russia".

See also
 List of karate competitors
 List of karateka
 Russian Version

References

 Alexander Gerunov Komsomolskaya Pravda February 18, 2005

External links
 

1979 births
Living people
People from Tolyatti
Sportspeople from Tolyatti
Russian male karateka
Russian male taekwondo practitioners
World Games gold medalists
Wadō-ryū practitioners
Competitors at the 2005 World Games